Australian metalcore band Parkway Drive have released seven studio albums, one live album and three video albums.

Albums

Studio albums

Live albums

Video albums

Split albums

Extended plays

Singles

Other charted songs

Music videos

References

Discographies of Australian artists